Bernard Millant (1929 – 5 April 2017) was a bow maker, archetier and luthier in Paris, France. He was the son of Max Millant.
He studied violin making at Amédée Dieudonné's workshop in Mirecourt. He also studied bowmaking with Louis Morizot alongside the Morizot Frères.
He is known as an expert and for his reliable certificates for fine French bows, and was author of the definitive book on French Bows:

References

External links

L'Archet Éditions
Le Canu-Millant, Paris: lutherie and expertise
photos
 
 
 
 
 
 List of Contemporary Bow Makers

1929 births
2017 deaths
Luthiers from Paris
Bow makers